Lecythium is a genus of testate amoebae within the Chlamydophryidae. These amoebae bear a thin and hyaline test and are common in freshwater and soil, one marine species is known. Lecythium spp. feed on fungi or algae.

Described Lecythium species 
 Lecythium hyalinum (type species)
 Lecythium granulatus
 Lecythium minutum
 Lecythium kryptosis
 Lecythium mutabilis
 Lecythium terrestris
 Lecythium spinosum

References

Chlamydophryidae
Cercozoa genera